Camillo De Riso (1854–1924) was an Italian actor and film director.

Camillo De Riso, a native from Naples died in Rome on 2 July 1924.

Selected filmography
 Love Everlasting (1913)
 Floretta and Patapon (1913)
 The Lady of the Camellias (1915)
 Odette (1916)
 Niniche (1918)
 Mariute (1918)
 Take Care of Amelia (1925)

References

Bibliography
 Goble, Alan. The Complete Index to Literary Sources in Film. Walter de Gruyter, 1999.

External links

1854 births
1924 deaths
Italian film directors
Italian male stage actors
Italian male film actors
Italian male silent film actors
20th-century Italian male actors
19th-century Neapolitan people